The 2012 Kermadec Islands eruption was a major undersea volcanic eruption that was produced by the previously little-known Havre Seamount near the L'Esperance and L'Havre Rocks in the Kermadec Islands of New Zealand.

Three months after the eruption, the mass had dispersed into very dilute rafts and ribbons of floating pumice clasts. Most pumice clasts became waterlogged and sank to the sea floor, while some flocks have stranded in the Tonga islands, on the northern shores of New Zealand, and eventually on the eastern coast of Australia one year after the eruption.

While the eruption is officially rated as a VEI 1 by the Smithsonian Institution, studies have found that approximately 1.5 cubic kilometres of material erupted, which correlates to a VEI 5 eruption.

Eruption

The eruption of the Havre Seamount was not initially noticed by scientists, and volcanologists were not even aware that the Havre Seamount was an active submarine volcano. After the pumice raft was detected, researchers retrospectively examined satellite imagery and past seismic activity in an attempt to pinpoint the time and location of the eruption that produced the pumice raft. Seismologists discovered a cluster of earthquakes (ranging in magnitude between 3.0 and 4.8) that occurred 18–19 July 2012. These earthquakes were consistent with magma rising into a magma chamber prior to eruption. Analysis of satellite imagery showed an ash plume appear on 18 July 2012 and conclude several days later. Although some volcanologists initially believed that the eruption might have occurred at the Monowai Seamount, this possibility was later ruled out. It is also believed that the eruption was unrelated to the 2012 Te Māri eruption at New Zealand's Mount Tongariro.

In 2015 a scientific expedition set out to study changes of seafloor topography in the area surrounding Havre Seamount. The same group of researchers mapped the distribution of the floating pumice blocks driven by wind, ocean currents and eddies.

Pumice raft

Scientists were not aware that any eruption had occurred until a huge pumice raft was sighted and photographed at 14:40 NZST on 31 July 2012 by Maggie de Grauw while on a commercial flight from Faleolo, Samoa to Auckland, New Zealand. She emailed her pictures to Dr Scott Bryan, senior research fellow at Queensland University of Technology. Bryan then contacted Olivier Hyvernaud from the Laboratoire de Géophysique, Tahiti, who confirmed the location from Terra/MODIS imagery from NASA. The raft was subsequently sighted by members of the New Zealand Defence Force on 9 August 2012—several weeks after the eruption had occurred. It was spotted by an Orion aircraft and then approached and sampled by the strategic sealift ship HMNZS Canterbury. An officer in the Royal Australian Navy said that it was "the weirdest thing [he had] seen in 18 years at sea".

References

Submarine eruptions
21st-century volcanic events
Geography of the New Zealand seabed
Seamounts of the Pacific Ocean
Kermadec Islands
Floating islands
Kermadec Islands eruption
History of the New Zealand outlying islands
Kermadec Islands
Volcanic eruptions in New Zealand